Flomaria is a traditional pasta made on the island of Lemnos. They are made from flour, eggs, milk, and salt. They are made adding egg, such as hilopites, but their size is longer.

It is used also for a traditional recipe of the island; rooster with flomaria.

References

Sources
tasteatlas.com

Greek cuisine
Greek pasta
Types of pasta